Petro Enright (born 15 February 1983) is a Namibian cricketer. In August 2019, she was named in Namibia's squad for the 2019 ICC Women's World Twenty20 Qualifier tournament in Scotland. She made her Women's Twenty20 International (WT20I) debut for the Namibia women's cricket team on 31 August 2019, against Ireland, during the 2019 ICC Women's World Twenty20 Qualifier.

References

External links
 

1983 births
Living people
Namibian women cricketers
Namibia women Twenty20 International cricketers
Place of birth missing (living people)